Chamarel FC is a Mauritian football club based in Bambous. They play in the Mauritian League, the top division in Mauritian football.

Stadium
Their home stadium is Stade Germain Comarmond (cap. 5,000), located in Bambous.

References

External links
Soccerway

Football clubs in Mauritius